Oral contraceptives, abbreviated OCPs, also known as birth control pills, are medications taken by mouth for the purpose of birth control.

Female 
Two types of female oral contraceptive pill, taken once per day, are widely available:

 The combined oral contraceptive pill contains estrogen and a progestin. Colloquially known as "The Pill".
 The progestogen-only pill, colloquially known as "minipill".
 Ormeloxifene is a selective estrogen receptor modulator which offers the benefit of only having to be taken once a week.

Emergency contraception pills ("morning after pills") are taken at the time of intercourse, or within a few days afterwards:

 Levonorgestrel, sold under the brand name Plan B
 Ulipristal acetate
 Mifepristone and misoprostol, when used in combination, are more than 95% effective during the first 50 days of pregnancy.

Male 
 Male oral contraceptives are currently not available commercially, although several possibilities are in various stages of research and development.

Hormonal contraception